Marine Life is a Canadian drama film, directed by Anne Wheeler and released in 2000. Based on the short story collection of the same name by Linda Svendsen, the film stars Cybill Shepherd as June, a jazz singer coping with feelings of failure in her career and her complicated relationships with her teenage daughter Adele (Alexandra Purvis) and her boyfriend Robert (Peter Outerbridge).

Shepherd agreed to take the role in part because she had been a fan of Wheeler's previous film Better Than Chocolate. The film's cast also includes Gabrielle Miller, Michael Hogan and Tyler Labine.

The film premiered at the 2000 Toronto International Film Festival.

The film received two Genie Award nominations at the 22nd Genie Awards in 2002, for Best Actor (Outerbridge) and Best Sound Editing (Gael MacLean, Jim Harrington, Patrick Haskill, Michael Keeping and Gina Mueller).

References

External links
 

2000 films
2000 drama films
Canadian drama films
English-language Canadian films
Films set in British Columbia
Films shot in British Columbia
Films directed by Anne Wheeler
2000s English-language films
2000s Canadian films